In Pictures is the sixteenth studio album by American country music band Alabama, released in 1995. It included the singles "She Ain't Your Ordinary Girl", "In Pictures", "It Works", "Say I" and "The Maker Said Take Her", which respectively reached  2,  4,  19,  38 and  4 on the Hot Country Songs charts. Making it the first album of their career not to produce a number one hit. The title track was originally recorded by Linda Davis on her 1994 album Shoot for the Moon. The album peaked at No. 100 on the Billboard 200 album charts and No. 12 on the Billboard Country Albums chart.

The album was recorded at Emerald studios in Nashville, Tennessee.

Track listing

Personnel 

Alabama
 Jeff Cook – guitars, fiddle, backing vocals, lead vocals (11)
 Randy Owen – guitars, lead vocals (1-10), backing vocals (11)
 Teddy Gentry – bass guitar, backing vocals
 Mark Herndon – drums, percussion

Additional Musicians

 John Barlow Jarvis – keyboards
 Mike Lawler– keyboards
 Steve Nathan – keyboards
 Richard Bennett – acoustic guitar, electric guitar
 Biff Watson – acoustic guitar, mandolin
 Steve Gibson – electric guitar
 Larry Hanson – electric guitar
 Dann Huff – electric guitar
 Chris Leuzinger – electric guitar
 Brent Mason – electric guitar
 Craig Krampf – drums
 Lonnie Wilson – drums
 Emory Gordy Jr. – string arrangements (8, 10)
 John Catchings – cello
 Jim Grosjean – viola
 Kathryn Plummer – viola
 Kristin Wilkinson – viola
 David Davidson – violin
 Connie Ellisor – violin
 Connie Heard – violin
 Christian Teal – violin

Production

 Alabama – producers
 Emory Gordy Jr. – producer
 Russ Martin – recording (1, 7, 8)
 Alan Schulman – recording (2-6, 9, 10, 11)
 Tim Waters – assistant engineer 
 John Guess – mixing 
 Derek Bason – mix assistant 
 Glenn Meadows – mastering 
 Lauren Koch – production coordinator 
 Susan Eaddy – art direction 
 Mary Hamilton – art direction 
 Kym Juister – design
 Scott Bonner – photo illustration 
 Ron Keith – photography

Charts

Weekly charts

Year-end charts

Certifications

References

1995 albums
RCA Records albums
Alabama (American band) albums
Albums produced by Emory Gordy Jr.